Francisco Martín Moreno (1879 – 23 April 1941) was a Spanish military officer who served as Chief of the Defence High Command  between 1940 and 1941, i.e., chief of staff of the Spanish Armed Forces during the Francoist dictatorship.

References

1879 births
1941 deaths
20th-century Spanish military personnel
Spanish generals
Spanish military personnel of the Spanish Civil War (National faction)